The 2016–17 Marquette Golden Eagles men's basketball team represented Marquette University in the 2016–17 NCAA Division I men's basketball season. The Golden Eagles, led by third-year head coach Steve Wojciechowski, played their home games at the BMO Harris Bradley Center, and were members of the Big East Conference. They finished the season 19–12, 10–8 in Big East play to finish in a four-way tie for third place. As the No. 4 seed in the Big East tournament, they lost to Seton Hall in the quarterfinals. They received an at-large bid to the NCAA tournament as a No. 10 seed in the East region where they lost to South Carolina in the First Round.

Previous season 
The Golden Eagles finished the 2015–16 season 20–13, 8–10 in Big East play to finish in seventh place. They defeated St. John's in the first round of the Big East tournament to advance to the quarterfinals where they lost to Xavier. Despite having 20 wins, they did not participate in a postseason tournament.

Offseason

Departures

Incoming transfers

2016 recruiting class

2017 recruiting class

Preseason 
Prior to the season, Marquette was picked to finish seventh in a poll of Big East coaches. Luke Fischer was named to the preseason All-Big East second team.

Roster

Schedule and results

|-
!colspan=9 style=| Exhibition

|-
!colspan=9 style=| Non-conference regular season

|-
!colspan=9 style=|Big East regular season

|-
!colspan=9 style=| Big East tournament

|-
!colspan=9 style=| NCAA tournament

References

Marquette Golden Eagles
Marquette Golden Eagles men's basketball seasons
Marquette
Marquette
Marquette